DYXL (93.9 FM), broadcasting as 93.9 iFM, is a radio station owned and operated by Radio Mindanao Network. The station's studio and offices are located at the RMN Broadcast Center, G/F Capitol Central Hotel & Suites, N. Escario St. cor. F. Ramos Ext., Capitol Site, Cebu City, while its transmitter facilities are located in Sitio Seaside Asinan, Brgy. Basak San Nicolas, Cebu City (shared with sister station DYHP).

History

1976-2002: DYHP/YXL
DYXL was the third RMN FM station and the fourth FM station in Cebu, established in 1976 under the call letters DYHP. Two years later, the station was officially launched on September 9, 1978 as YXL 93.9. Dubbed as "The Beautiful Romance", it aired an easy listening format. Its first studio was located along Legazpi cor. Manalili Sts. In a few years, YXL became one of the most-listening FM station in Cebu.

Most notable DJ's who worked on the station at that time including Joe Jammer, Naughty Dundee, Ric Ryan, Harry Harrison, Mighty Might, Sexy Susan, Johnny Kawa and Lady Daisy with an all English spiels.

In September 1988, in time for DYHP's 25th anniversary, YXL 93.9 celebrated its 10th anniversary with the theme "25-10 on September 13", a promo event held at Cebu Coliseum.

1992-1999: Smile Radio
On August 16, 1992, the station was relaunched as Smile Radio 93.9 YXL and adopted the slogan "The Voice of Music", derived from its flagship station in Cagayan de Oro. It became the first FM radio station in the market to carry a mass-based format. In 1993, the station's studios moved to Gold Palace Bldg. in Osmeña Blvd.

The station ended its broadcast on November 22, 1999, a span of almost seven years under the Smile Radio network, which signified a branding to all RMN FM stations.

1999-2002: XLFM
On November 23, 1999, the station rebranded as 939 XLFM (pronounced as "nine-three-nine") and carried the slogan "Live it Up!". It switched into a Top 40 format. It initially operated from 4:00 AM to 9:00 PM. At that time, the station was previously located at the 2nd Floor, Gold Palace Bldg. along Osmeña Blvd.

After almost 3 years, XLFM signed off the air for the last time on May 15, 2002.

2002-present: iFM
On May 16, 2002, the station was relaunched as 93.9 iFM & switched back to its mass-based format, with its first slogan "Hit after hit, iFM". It expanded its broadcast hours to 20 hours daily, signing off at 12:00 MN. Since 2008, iFM airs 24 hours a day. According to the Nielsen Radio Audience Measurement Survey, iFM was the over-all Number 1 FM station in Metro Cebu from 2002 to 2013.

In 2005, the station launched its love-advice program, Dear iFM, wherein listeners asking for letter senders to share their stories of love, heartaches, struggles, joys and even strange ones.

On May 26, 2012, iFM and its sister station DYHP went off the air and moved to its present studios new broadcast centers at the Ground Floor of Capitol Central Hotel and Suites along Capitol Site.

In 2014, iFM leaned a more localized approach in its programming, adopting the slogan LR, Lahi raaah!. On July 24, 2017, iFM changed its slogan to i Na Beh!, along with the return of the 7-note sound mnemonic from 2002. Since then, its DJs started using Cebuano as their language. On Easter Sunday, April 1, 2018, the slogan was changed into i Na Ta!, a variant of the slogan used by the iFM Davao. On July 30, 2018, the station brought back its slogan LR! Lahi Ra!.

In 2019, iFM added news and talk to its format and began simulcasting DYHP's morning program Straight To The Point. In mid-2022, iFM began carrying iFM Music and News for its news and talk programming. In July that year, it launched its Sunday programs Gasa sa iFM, a public service program which listeners who asking to helped on-air, and Iwag sa iFM, an afternoon program which sharing their inspiring stories about love life.

On July 25, 2022, the station upgraded to a newly improved 10,000-watt transmitter in Sitio Seaside Asinan, Brgy. Basak San Nicolas for better signal reception and audio quality

References

News and talk radio stations in the Philippines
DYXL
Radio stations in Metro Cebu
IFM stations